The Women's Premier Soccer League Canada (WPSL Canada) is a proposed semi-professional women's soccer league in Canada. It announced plans to begin play as a division 2 league, which would make it the top league for women's soccer in the Canadian soccer pyramid.

The US-based Women's Premier Soccer League (WPSL) previously hosted Canadian teams playing across the border, but is now building the WPSL Canada, which is a separate entity incorporated in Canada and run by Canadians. The league stated a desire to establish a foundation for women's soccer in Canada to attract further investment for a future professional division.

League structure 
The league shared plans to operate in two conferences: Canada West and Canada East. Clubs would play matches each season against other clubs in their respective conferences, followed by conference playoffs and a national championship.

The league would work with a limited partnership model as opposed to a membership model. Clubs that buy into the league would receive votes and financial incentives in a similar way that the Canadian Premier League teams have a stake in Canada Soccer Business.

Governance 
 the WPSL Canada's leadership group consisted of Santiago Almada, Sam Bacso, and the US-based WPSL organization.

Teams 
The league announced that all clubs would be held to a high National 2 license standard supplied by Canadian Soccer Association (CSA). These standards would assure that all clubs in the league meet requirements in all categories to qualify to successfully participate in the league. These standards include financial, infrastructure, technical and sporting, administrative, governance, and legal criteria.

The league hinted at teams representing Toronto, Montreal, Calgary, and Vancouver as launch cities, however full details for launch clubs in those metropolitan areas have not yet been announced.

Reception 
The announcement of the proposed league was met with mixed reactions. While some players applauded WPSL Canada for creating new domestic opportunities for Canadians, others including Canada women's national soccer team player Stephanie Labbé and former player Amy Walsh criticized the proposed league for not "answering the call" for a fully professional Canadian league.

References

External links

Women's Premier Soccer League
Soccer in Canada
Women's soccer in Canada
Canadian Soccer Association
Semi-professional sports leagues
Soccer leagues in Canada
Sports leagues established in 2021
2021 establishments in Canada